Scovardă is a type of stuffed pastry similar to empanadas popular in Romania, mainly Transylvania. They are usually referred to by the plural form "scoverzi".

Preparation 
The dough is folded around the stuffing which usually consists of different types of cheese, including urdă. Dill can also be added to the cheese stuffing.
 Variations:
 fruit preserve filling
 no filling and the resulting scoverzi are covered with powdered sugar, resembling pancakes.
They are cooked by pan frying in sunflower oil.

See also

References 

Dumplings
Pancakes
Romanian desserts
Cheese dishes
Stuffed dishes